Vitta zebra, commonly known as the zebra nerite, is a species of sea snail, a marine gastropod mollusk in the family Neritidae, the nerites.

Description
Its maximum size is 1 inch. It is yellow with black stripes. It has an operculum.

Distribution
Trinidad and Tobago and Brazil

In The Aquarium

The zebra nerite snail is frequently sold in the aquarium hobby. These specimens are typically wild caught, since the snail is difficult to breed in captivity.

This snail is typically sold as an algae eater as it will constantly scrape the glass, hardscape and substrate of the aquarium for algae with its rasping mouth. They are capable of surviving in fresh water, though they require a high PH. A low enough PH will slowly destroy the snail's shell. Also, if an aquarium does not have enough algae, it may be difficult to get them to eat pellet food and they may starve. 

Like most nerite snails, it can and often will simply crawl up the glass of an aquarium and leave it, and so a lid is needed to house them.

References

 Eichhorst T.E. (2016). Neritidae of the world. Volume 2. Harxheim: Conchbooks. Pp. 696-1366

External links
 Bruguière J.G. (1792). Catalogue des coquilles envoyées de Cayenne, à la Société d'histoire naturelle de Paris, par M. Le Blond. Actes de la Société d'Histoire Naturelle de Paris. 1: 126-129

Neritidae
Gastropods described in 1792